Thundarr the Barbarian is an American Saturday morning animated series, created by Steve Gerber and produced by Ruby-Spears Productions. The series ran for two seasons on ABC from October 4, 1980, to October 31, 1981, and was rerun on NBC in 1983.

Plot
Thundarr the Barbarian is set in a future (c. 3994) post-apocalyptic wasteland of Earth divided into kingdoms and territories, the majority of which are ruled by wizards, and whose ruins typically feature recognizable geographical features from the United States, such as New York City, Los Angeles, Las Vegas, Seattle, the Badlands, Mount Rushmore, Denver, Atlanta, Boston, San Antonio and its Alamo, San Francisco, Washington, D.C., Cape Canaveral, and the Grand Canyon. Other episodes with recognizable settings are set outside the United States, and include Mexico and London, UK. Another notable feature of this future Earth is that the Moon was broken in two pieces. The shattered moon and the ruins of the former human civilization were caused by the passage of a runaway planet between the Earth and the Moon in 1994, which, from scenes shown in the opening sequence, caused radical changes in the Earth's climate and geography. However, by the time period in which the series is set, the Earth and Moon seem to have settled into a new physical balance. Earth is reborn with a world of "savagery, super-science, and sorcery" far more chaotic than "Old Earth" (the show's name for the preapocalyptic world).

The hero Thundarr (voiced by Robert Ridgely), a muscular warrior, and companions Princess Ariel, a formidable young sorceress, and Ookla the Mok, a mighty lion-like biped, travel the world on horseback, fighting injustice. Their main adversaries are evil wizards who combine magical spells with reanimating technologies from the pre-catastrophe world. Some of these malevolent wizards enlist the service of certain mutant species to do their bidding.

Other enemies include The Brotherhood of Night (a group of werewolves who could transform others into werewolves by their touch), the cosmic Stalker from The Stars (a predatory, malevolent cosmic vampire), and various other mutants. Intelligent humanoid-animal races include the rat-like Groundlings, the crocodile-like Carocs, and talking hawk- and pig-like mutants. New animals that existed include fire-shooting whales, a giant green snake with a grizzly bear's head, and mutated dragonflies and rabbits.

Thundarr's weapon is the Sunsword that projects a blade-like beam of energy when activated, and can be deactivated so that it is only a hilt. The Sunsword's energy blade can deflect other energy attacks as well as magical ones, can cut through nearly anything, and can disrupt magical spells and effects. The Sunsword is magically linked to Thundarr and as such, only he can use it; however, this link can be disrupted.

Comic book writer-artist Jack Kirby worked on the production design for the show. The main characters were designed by fellow comic book writer-artist Alex Toth. Toth, however, was unavailable to continue working on the show, so most of the wizards and other villains and secondary characters that appear on the show were designed by Kirby. He was brought onto the show at the recommendation of comic writer Steve Gerber and Mark Evanier.

The series was the creation of Steve Gerber. Gerber and friend Martin Pasko were having dinner in the Westwood area one night during the time Gerber was developing the series. Gerber commented to Pasko that he had not yet decided upon a name for the wookiee-like character the network insisted be added to the series, over Gerber's objections. As the two walked past the gate to the UCLA campus, Pasko quipped, "Why not call him Oo-clah?" Pasko later became one of several screenwriters also known for their work in comics, such as Roy Thomas and Gerry Conway, to contribute to the show. After writing several scripts, singly and in collaboration with Gerber, Pasko became a story editor on the second season. Other writers included Buzz Dixon and Mark Jones.

Characters
The series' narrator was Dick Tufeld.

 Thundarr (voiced by Robert Ridgely) – The main protagonist of the series. He is a barbarian who was once a slave to Sabian until he was freed by Princess Ariel and given the Sunsword which he uses as a weapon in his fight against evil wizards and other villains. Thundarr was known for frequently uttering such pronouncements as "Demon dogs!", "Lords of Light!", and his war-cry "Aaaaa-HEE!". Thundarr, along with his friend Ookla, are largely unknowledgeable about the world and rely on Ariel's guidance, but Thundarr is respectful of knowledge gained.
 Ookla the Mok (voiced by Henry Corden) – Ookla is a member of the Mok species, a leonine humanoid with fangs and yellow eyes. In Thundarr the Barbarians backstory, Ookla and Thundarr were enslaved in the court of the wizard Sabian until Sabian's stepdaughter Princess Ariel helped them escape. As a Mok, Ookla has great strength, usually fighting by ripping up a nearby sapling or piece of wreckage to club his enemies. On a few occasions, he is shown to use a longbow that fires a type of paralyzing arrow. However, he is also the most likely of the heroes to charge right into an enemy attack or to be enraged by unusual nuisances or threats. Moks dwell in their own territory, ruled by a king; they fear and hate water. While they prefer to face perilous odds on land rather than travel by water, in extreme cases they can be persuaded to fight on water. While Ariel generally understands Ookla, Thundaar is more knowledgeable about Ookla, arguably because they became friends and worked together during the time they were enslaved. Whereas Thundarr and Ariel ride horses for transportation (his is white; hers is brown), Ookla's steed is another quadrupedal species called an equort.
 Princess Ariel (voiced by Nellie Bellflower) – Ariel is a powerful sorceress. Not much was revealed about her past before she met Thundarr except that she was the stepdaughter of an evil wizard named Sabian. She learned of Earth's history from his library, and thus is considered the "academic" of the group. In the episode "Battle of The Barbarians", it is revealed that Thundarr was once a slave of the evil wizard Sabian before being freed by Princess Ariel. It was never revealed exactly where she was a princess. Her most common feats of sorcery involved creating light constructs such as archways and bridges, exploding spheres and levitating weights to summoning nets, shields, or bridges over chasms. She could also produce powerful energy blasts, blinding light and magically reanimate machines. When her wrists are bound together, she cannot work her magic, and is vulnerable to capture. At times she shows romantic feelings towards Thundarr; although he never outwardly returns them, it is clear that he does care greatly for her and considers her an important team member. Ariel's attire consists of knee-high boots, wrist bracelets, and an open-backed, leg-baring cyan (with yellow trim) costume which resembles a bathing suit.

Additional voices
The series' voice director was Alan Dinehart.

 Henry Corden in addition to Ookla the Mok, Corden voiced: Caroc Leader, Gemini, Vortak, Skullus, Captain Willows (in "Island of the Body Snatchers"), Mutant Deputy #2 (in "Trial by Terror")
 Michael Ansara as Vashtarr
 Marlene Aragon as Maya
 Liz Aubrey as Valorie Storm
 Michael Bell as Yondo
 Alan Dinehart
 Al Fann
 Joe Higgins as Korb
 Stacy Keach Sr.
 Keye Luke as Zevon, Kublai
 Chuck McCann as Artemus, Mutant Deputy #1 (in "Trial by Terror")
 Nancy McKeon as Tye
 Julie McWhirter as Stryia
 Shepard Menken
 Alan Oppenheimer as Mindok, Morag
 Avery Schreiber as Octagon
 Hal Smith as Simius
 Joan Van Ark as Cinda, Queen Diona
 Janet Waldo as Circe
 William Woodson as Crom

Production
Twenty-one half-hour episodes were produced by Ruby-Spears Productions, an animation house formed by former Hanna-Barbera head writers Joe Ruby and Ken Spears, from October 1980 to October 1981 on the ABC network. Despite decent ratings, the show was cancelled, as Paramount wanted to make room in the programming schedule for Laverne & Shirley in the Army. Reruns of Thundarr appeared on NBC's Saturday morning lineup in 1983.

Episodes

Season 1 (1980)
All episodes of season 1 were directed by Rudy Larriva and produced by Jerry Eisenberg.

Season 2 (1981)
All episodes of season 2 were directed by Rudy Larriva and John Kimball, with animation supervision by Milt Gray & Bill Reed.

Home media releases
The debut episode of Thundarr the Barbarian was released on DVD as part of Warner Home Video's Saturday Morning Cartoons: 1980s compilation series. The DVD set, containing episodes of ten other shows, was released on May 4, 2010.

On September 28, 2010, Warner Archive released Thundarr the Barbarian: The Complete Series to DVD in region 1 as part of their Hanna–Barbera Classics Collection. This is a Manufacture-on-Demand (MOD) release, available exclusively through Warner's online store and Amazon.com. The DVD set is branded as part of the Hanna-Barbera Classics Collection as Thundarr and the other 1978–91 Ruby-Spears programs were sold to Turner Broadcasting in 1991 alongside Hanna-Barbera by Great American Broadcasting. On April 6, 2021, Warner Archive also released Thundarr the Barbarian: The Complete Series on Blu-ray. Unlike the DVD release, the Blu-ray release restored the Ruby-Spears Productions logo, but the Filmways logo was still removed for the first season (due to being copyrighted by Hanna-Barbera).

Influence
In a November 2017 interview with Revolver, Morbid Angel guitarist Trey Azagthoth stated that the band's new album, Kingdoms Disdained, is based on Thundarr the Barbarian, 

There is also a filk band from New York called Ookla the Mok. The series was referenced and was involved in the plot of the third-season episode "One Watson, One Holmes" of the CBS television series Elementary. In Fairlady #3, by Brian Schirmer and Claudia Balboni, the characters Dunkarr, the Barbarian, Ari and Oosk were inspired by the main characters in the series.

Merchandise

Toys
Action figures of the three main characters were released by Toynami in 2003. A board game was released by Milton Bradley Company in 1982.

Comics and books
A Sunday strip illustrated by Jack Kirby was planned, but the project was canceled. In 1982, a coloring book was published by Golden Books. According to Mark Evanier, Whitman Comics had a Thundarr comic book project with scripts by John David Warner and art by Winslow Mortimer.

See also
 Blackstar (TV series)

Notes

References

External links
 
 Toonopedia entry

1980s American animated television series
1980s American science fiction television series
1980 American television series debuts
1981 American television series endings
American children's animated action television series
American children's animated adventure television series
American children's animated science fantasy television series
American Broadcasting Company original programming
English-language television shows
NBC original programming
Post-apocalyptic animated television series
Ruby-Spears superheroes
Television series about the Moon
Television series by Ruby-Spears
Television series created by Joe Ruby
Television series created by Ken Spears
Television series set in 1994
Television series set in the 4th millennium
Television series set in the future
Characters created by Alex Toth
Works by Jack Kirby
Television series by Filmways
American action adventure television series
Television series created by Steve Gerber
Television series about barbarians
Television about magic
Television series about mutants